was a major in the Imperial Japanese Military during World War II.

He was known for his failed assassination attempt on controversial Japanese Prime Minister Hideki Tojo.

Biography
He came from a family of Nagano Prefecture. His uncle was Kosaka Takeo, a Diet member. He served in China under Prince Mikasa. As the war progressed, Tsunoda sought for the resignation of Prime Minister Tojo. He plotted to assassinate Tojo, but Tojo resigned before the assassination could be executed. Tsunoda was arrested for his role in the plot. He admitted that he planned to kill Tojo, and launch a new cabinet under Prince Higashikuni.

See also
Japanese dissidence during the Shōwa period
Sōkichi Takagi

References

Further reading

Japanese rebels
Japanese military personnel of World War II